The Appalachian Sports Network is a group of 17 radio stations that carry Appalachian State University sports. The flagship station is WKBC-FM 97.3 in North Wilkesboro, North Carolina. The network had previously been known as the Appalachian ISP Sports Network; when ISP Sports was bought by IMG Worldwide subsidiary, IMG College, in 2010, the network became the Appalachian IMG Sports Network. The IMG was dropped when IMG and Learfield Sports merged to form Learfield IMG College in 2018.

Announcers
This is the current announcer list.
 David Jackson – Football, Men's Basketball, Baseball Lead Announcer
 Steve Brown – Football Color Analyst
 Randy Jackson – Football Sideline Reporter, Men's Basketball Color Analyst
 Tim Sparks – Football Pregame Host, On-Site Engineer
 Phil Brame – Studio Host
 Josh Campbell – Women's Basketball Lead Announcer
 Tige Darner – Men's and Women's Basketball Color Analyst
 Jim Morris – Baseball Color Analyst

Affiliates 
The following stations are 2012–13 network affiliates.

References

External list
2019–20 football affiliates

 

Sports radio networks in the United States
Appalachian State Mountaineers
College football on the radio
Learfield IMG College sports radio networks